Rosendo José Álvarez Hernández (born May 6, 1970) is a Nicaraguan retired professional boxer. He is a former two-division champion and is well known for giving Mexican legend Ricardo López two tough fights. He is the only person to hold the undefeated strawweight champion to a draw.

Professional career 
Álvarez made his professional debut on May 23, 1988. He accumulated a record of 19-0, which included a TKO victory over future champion José Bonilla, before challenging for a world title.

WBA minimumweight title
On December 2, 1995, he traveled to Thailand and won the World Boxing Association strawweight title by close split decision over undefeated Thai champion Chana Porpaoin, who was 9-0 in title fights. In 1996, he defended his title three times including a third round knockout over future champion Kermin Guardia, a decision win over former champion Eric Chavez, and an eighth round knockout over undefeated prospect Takashi Shiohama. He had one bout in 1997, an eleventh round knockout over undefeated future interim champion Songkram Porpaoin (twin brother of Chana), for his fourth title defense.

Fights with López
In 1998, he fought to a draw with undefeated reigning WBC champ and pound-for-pound ranked Ricardo Lopez, dropping Lopez for the first and only time in his career. The fight was stopped in the 8th round when Lopez suffered a cut from a clash of heads, resulting in a technical draw on the scorecards. A rematch was set for later in the year, however, the fight was in jeopardy of taking place as Alvarez failed to make weight by 3 1/4 pounds.  He was stripped of the title and the two met at an over the 105-pound strawweight limit, with the WBA title being on the line for Lopez only.  Alvarez lost the rematch by a 12-round split decision, suffering his first loss as a professional.

WBA light flyweight title
Álvarez then moved up to the 108 lb division and won his following three fights, including a decision victory over future champion Tomás Rojas. On August 12, 2000, he lost by seventh round disqualification for repeated low blows to Beibis Mendoza for the vacant WBA light flyweight title. He later avenged this loss by twelve round split decision to claim the title. In his following fight, he faced Pichit Siriwat, who had previously defended the same WBA title five times before being stripped of it in 2000 for failing to defend it against Alvarez. He defeated Siriwat by 12th-round TKO. In 2003, he defeated Mendoza for a second time by decision and gained recognition as Ring light flyweight champion. Later that year, he fought to a twelve-round draw against then-IBF champ José Víctor Burgos in a unification bout. In 2004, he was stripped of his WBA and Ring light flyweight titles prior to a fourth meeting with Mendoza, due to his failure to make weight. He went on to win the fight by split decision.

WBC flyweight title loss and doping controversy 
On May 8, 2006, he challenged Jorge Arce for the interim WBC flyweight title, but was defeated by 6th round tko. After the fight, Álvarez was suspended by the Nevada Athletic Commission for the rest of 2006 and fined $2,000 because he failed a post-fight urinalysis. Álvarez tested positive for the banned diuretic Furosemide, also known as Lasix.

Retirement 
Álvarez is a promoter and manager in his native Nicaragua and it is assumed that the Arce fight was his last effort as a combatant.

Comeback 
In 2012, Álvarez returned to the ring at age 42, but lost by 5th round disqualification.

Professional boxing record

See also
List of world mini-flyweight boxing champions
List of world light-flyweight boxing champions

References

External links

 

1970 births
Living people
Nicaraguan male boxers
Nicaraguan sportspeople in doping cases
Sportspeople from Managua
Doping cases in boxing
Mini-flyweight boxers
Light-flyweight boxers
Flyweight boxers
World mini-flyweight boxing champions
World light-flyweight boxing champions
World Boxing Association champions
The Ring (magazine) champions